Canton Township is an inactive township in Lewis County, in the U.S. state of Missouri.

Canton Township was established in 1830, taking its name from the community of Canton, Missouri.

References

Townships in Missouri
Townships in Lewis County, Missouri